Julian Carroll Spence (May 5, 1929 – March 6, 1990) was an American football defensive back who played two seasons with the Houston Oilers of the American Football League. He played college football at Sam Houston State University and attended L. C. Anderson High School in Austin, Texas. He was also a member of the Chicago Cardinals and San Francisco 49ers of the National Football League.

Professional career

Chicago Cardinals
Spence played in eight games for the Chicago Cardinals in 1956.

San Francisco 49ers
Spence played in three games for the San Francisco 49ers during the 1957 season.

Houston Oilers
Spence played in 24 games for the Houston Oilers from 1960 to 1961. He won two AFL titles with the team.

Persoali life
Spence served in the United States Army, earning the rank of first lieutenant. He died at his home in Harris County, Texas, on March 6, 1990, after an undisclosed illness.

References

External links
Just Sports Stats

1929 births
1990 deaths
American football defensive backs
Sam Houston Bearkats football players
Chicago Cardinals players
San Francisco 49ers players
Houston Oilers players
United States Army officers
Players of American football from Austin, Texas
American Football League players